The Hepburn Act is a 1906 United States federal law that expanded the jurisdiction of the Interstate Commerce Commission (ICC) and gave it the power to set maximum railroad rates. This led to the discontinuation of free passes to loyal shippers. In addition, the ICC could view the railroads' financial records, a task simplified by standardized bookkeeping systems. For any railroad that resisted, the ICC's conditions would remain in effect until the outcome of legislation said otherwise. By the Hepburn Act, the ICC's authority was extended to cover bridges, terminals, ferries, railroad sleeping cars, express companies and oil pipelines.

Overview
The Hepburn Act was named for its sponsor, ten-term Iowa Republican congressman William Peters Hepburn. The final version was close to what President Theodore Roosevelt had asked for, and it easily passed Congress, with only three dissenting votes. The Act, along with the Elkins Act of 1903, was a component of one of Roosevelt's major policy goals: railroad regulation.

The most important provision of the law gave the ICC price control power to replace existing rates with "just-and-reasonable" maximum rates, and authorized the Commission to define what was just and reasonable. The Act made ICC orders binding; that is, the railroads had to either obey or contest the ICC orders in federal court. To speed the rate-setting process, the Act specified that appeals from rulings of the district courts would go directly to the U.S. Supreme Court.

Anti-rebate provisions were toughened, free passes were outlawed, and the penalties for violation were increased. The ICC staff grew from 104 in 1890 to 178 in 1905, 330 in 1907, and 527 in 1909. Finally, the ICC gained the power to prescribe a uniform system of accounting, require standardized reports, and inspect railroad accounts.

The limitation on railroad rates depreciated the value of railroad securities, a factor in causing the Panic of 1907.

Significance
Scholars consider the Hepburn Act the most important piece of legislation affecting railroads in the first half of the 20th century. Economists and historians debate whether it crippled the railroads, giving so much advantage to the shippers that a giant unregulated trucking industry—undreamed of in 1906—eventually took away their business.

Follow-up legislation
Congress passed the Mann–Elkins Act in 1910 during the administration of President William Howard Taft, to address limitations in implementation of the Hepburn Act. The Mann–Elkins Act authorized the ICC to initiate reviews of railroad rate increases, rather than simply responding to complaints from shippers. The 1910 law empowered the ICC to set "just and reasonable" maximum rates and placed the burden of proof upon the railroad for demonstrating reasonableness.

See also
 History of rail transport in the United States
 Interstate Commerce Act (1887)
 The Hepburn Committee (1879)
 Louisville & Nashville Railroad Co. v. Mottley (1908)

References

1906 in American law
Presidency of Theodore Roosevelt
United States railroad regulation
United States federal transportation legislation
1906 in rail transport
1906 in American politics
Progressive Era in the United States
History of rail transportation in the United States